The Bethlehem Cemetery is a historic cemetery in rural Washington County, Arkansas, United States. With its first documented burial in 1832, it is one of the oldest cemeteries in the county, and it is the only surviving remnant of the small frontier community of Bethlehem, which was established in 1827. The cemetery contains the remains of some of the area's earliest settlers, including the wife of preacher John Carnahan, who is believed to be the first person buried in the cemetery.

The cemetery was listed on the National Register of Historic Places in 2000.

See also
 National Register of Historic Places listings in Washington County, Arkansas

References

External links
 

Cemeteries on the National Register of Historic Places in Arkansas
Cultural infrastructure completed in 1832
Protected areas of Washington County, Arkansas
National Register of Historic Places in Washington County, Arkansas
1832 establishments in Arkansas Territory
Cemeteries established in the 1830s